Dundas Land District is a land district (cadastral division) of Western Australia within the Eucla Land Division. It spans roughly 31°40'S - 32°40'S in latitude and 121°00'E - 122°15'E in longitude.

Location and features
The district is located in the western part of the Shire of Dundas between Coolgardie and Esperance. It contains four gazetted townsites, the largest of which is Norseman, the western terminus of the Eyre Highway.

History
The district was approved on 25 September 1897 by the Commissioner of Crown Lands. As it was approved prior to the Land Act 1898, its boundaries were never gazetted.

References

Land districts of Western Australia
Goldfields-Esperance